The Cessna AT-17 Bobcat or Cessna Crane is a twin-engine advanced trainer aircraft designed and made in the United States, and used during World War II to bridge the gap between single-engine trainers and larger multi-engine combat aircraft. The commercial version was the Model T-50, from which the military versions were developed.

Design and development

In 1939, three years after Clyde Cessna retired, the Cessna T-50 made its first flight, becoming the company's first twin-engine airplane, and its first retractable undercarriage airplane. The prototype T-50 first flew on 26 March 1939, and was issued Approved Type Certificate 722 on 24 March 1940.

The AT-8, AT-17, C-78, UC-78 and Crane were military versions of the commercial Cessna T-50 light transport. The Cessna Airplane Company first produced the wood and tubular steel, fabric-covered T-50 in 1939 for the civilian market, as a lightweight and lower cost twin for personal use where larger aircraft such as the Beechcraft Model 18 would be too expensive. A low-wing cantilever monoplane, it featured retractable main landing gear and trailing edge wing flaps, both electrically actuated via chain-driven screws. The retracted main landing gear left some of the wheels extended below the engine nacelle for emergency wheel-up landings. The wing structure was built around laminated spruce spar beams, truss-style spruce and plywood ribs, and plywood wing leading edges and wing tips. The fixed tailwheel is not steerable, but can be locked straight. The Curtiss Reed metal fixed-pitch propellers were soon replaced with Hamilton Standard 2B-20-213 hydraulically-actuated, constant-speed, non-featherable propellers. Production began in December 1939.

Operational history

US Military
On 19 July 1940, United States Assistant Secretary of War Louis A. Johnson ordered 33 AT-8 trainers, based on the T-50 for the United States Army Air Corps (USAAC). Modifications included cockpit roof windows, more powerful  Lycoming R-680 engines and military radios. The first AT-8 was delivered to the USAAC in December 1940, and in late 1941, the US Army ordered an additional 450 AT-17s, based on the T-50. Modifications included additional cockpit windows and  Jacobs R-755-9 engines. Production for the U.S. Army Air Corps continued under the designation AT-17 reflecting a change in equipment and engine types. In 1942, the U.S. Army Air Force (the successor to the Air Corps from June 1941) ordered the Bobcat as a light transport as C-78s, which were redesignated as UC-78s on 1 January 1943. By the end of World War II, Cessna had produced more than 4,600 Bobcats for the U.S. Army, 67 of which were transferred to the United States Navy as JRC-1s. It was given the nickname the "Bamboo Bomber" in US service.  Few Bobcats were still in service with the United States Air Force when it was formed in September 1947, and the type was declared obsolete in 1949.

Royal Canadian Air Force
In September 1940, the Royal Canadian Air Force ordered 180 Crane Mk.I trainers, Cessna's largest order to date. Modifications for the RCAF included Hartzell fixed-pitch wooden propellers, removable cylinder head baffles, and oil heaters. The first Crane Mk.I was delivered to the RCAF in November 1940, and Cessna then received an additional order from the RCAF for 460 more Crane Mk.Is. An additional 182 AT-17A were received by the RCAF through lend-lease, operated under the designation Crane Mk.IA, bringing the total produced for the RCAF to 822, which were operated under the British Commonwealth Air Training Plan (BCATP).

Other operators
In addition to military orders, the Civil Aeronautics Administration (CAA, precursor to the FAA) ordered 13 T-50s, and Pan American Airways ordered 14 T-50s. Aircraft operated by the US military and by the RCAF were retired shortly after the end of the war and many were exported worldwide including to Brazil and the Nationalist Chinese. 

After the war, surplus AT-17s and UC-78s could be converted with CAA-approved kits to civilian-standard aircraft allowing their certification under the original T-50 approved type certificate. They were used by small airlines, charter and bush operators, and private pilots. Some were operated on floats. By the 1970s, the number of airworthy aircraft had dwindled as they were made obsolete by more modern types and by the maintenance required by their aging wood wing structures and fabric covering. Since then, several have been restored by antique airplane enthusiasts.

As of December 2017, FAA records show 52 T-50s, two AT-17s, and five UC-78s listed on its registration database.

Notable appearances in media
It was featured in the popular television series Sky King of the early-to-mid 1950s. The aircraft was replaced in later episodes by the T-50's successor, the all-metal Cessna 310.

Variants

Company designations

T-50fitted with Jacobs L-4MB radial piston engines.
P-7 experimental T-50 with more powerful  Jacobs L-6MB engines, and plywood covered tailplane and wings, one built, first flown 2 June 1941.
P-10 1941 advanced bomber trainer with modified fuselage, sliding canopy and  Jacobs engines, one built.

USAAC/USAAF designations

AT-8 Military advanced trainer with two  Lycoming R-680-9 radial piston engines, 33 built.
AT-17 As per AT-8 but powered by  Jacobs R-755-9 (L-4) engines, 450 built, some later converted to AT-17E.
AT-17A As per AT-17 but with metal propellers and reduced weight, 223 built. 182 to Canada as Crane Mk.IAs and later conversions to AT-17Fs.
AT-17B As per AT-17A but with equipment changes, wooden propellers and reduced weight, 466 built. Subsequent aircraft were built as UC-78Bs.
AT-17C As per AT-17A but different radio equipment, 60 built.
AT-17D As per AT-C with equipment changes, 131 built.
C-78 Transport with variable-pitch propellers, became UC-78 in 1943, 1354 built.
UC-78 C-78 redesignated in 1943
UC-78A 17 civilian T-50s impressed.
UC-78B AT-17B redesignated, 1806 built.

UC-78C AT-17D redesignated, 131 AT-17Ds redesignated and 196 built.

USN designation
JRC-1 Navy light transport version of the UC-78 with two Jacobs -9 engines, 67 delivered.

RCAF designations
Crane Mk.I 640 T-50s with minor equipment changes.
Crane Mk.IA 182 AT-17As delivered to RCAF under lend-lease.

Operators

 Brazilian Air Force (operated 39 from 1943 to 1956)
 
 Royal Canadian Air Force (operated 822 from 1941 to 1949)
No. 3 Service Flying Training School RCAF (SFTS) — Calgary, Alberta
No. 4 SFTS — RCAF Station Saskatoon
No. 10 SFTS — RCAF Station Dauphin
No. 11 SFTS — RCAF Station Yorkton
No. 12 SFTS — RCAF Station Brandon
No. 15 SFTS — RCAF Station Claresholm
No. 1 Flying Instructor School — RCAF Station Trenton
No. 2 Flying Instructor School — RCAF Station Vulcan/RCAF Station Pearce
No. 3 Flying Instructor School — RCAF Station Arnprior
Central Flying School — RCAF Station Trenton
 Queen Charlotte Airlines

 Air Force of Costa Rica (operated one in 1948)

 Ethiopian Air Force (operated two from 1946 to 1965)

 French Air Force and French Navy (operated eight from 1943 to 1951)

 Guatemalan Air Force (received one in 1949)

Haiti Air Corps (operated four from 1943 to 1995)

 Nicaraguan Air Force (received two in 1947)

 Yemeni Air Force (operated three from 1950 to 1958)

 Republic of China Air Force (operated 15 from 1946 to 1950)

 Peruvian Air Force (operated nine from 1945 to 1958)

 LOT Polish Airlines (operated 14 in 1946-1950)

 Civil Aeronautics Authority
 United States Army Air Corps/United States Army Air Forces
 United States Navy
 Northern Consolidated Airlines
 Wiggins Airways
 Wisconsin Central Airlines

Survivors and Museum aircraft

7729 Crane Mk.I at Royal Aviation Museum of Western Canada Winnipeg, Manitoba
7829 Crane Mk.I at Western Development Museum Moose Jaw, Saskatchewan
7862 Crane Mk.I at Canadian Warplane Heritage Museum Hamilton, Ontario
8676 Crane Mk.I at Canada Aviation and Space Museum Ottawa, Ontario 
8778 Crane Mk. IA Reynolds-Alberta Museum, Wetaskiwin, Alberta
8841 Crane Memorial Military Museum, Campbellford, Ontario
Cessna Crane (serial unknown) (CF-HGM) Crane at Bomber Command Museum of Canada Nanton, Alberta
Cessna Crane (serial unknown) at Commonwealth Air Training Plan Museum Brandon, Manitoba
42-72157 UC-78B Bobcat at Pima Air & Space Museum Tucson, Arizona
42-71626 UC-78B Bobcat at National Museum of the United States Air Force Dayton, Ohio
43-32549 UC-78 Bobcat at the National WASP WWII Museum at Avenger Field in Sweetwater, Texas

Specifications (AT-17)

See also

References

Notes

Citations

Bibliography
 

 

 

AT-17
1930s United States civil utility aircraft
1940s United States military trainer aircraft
Cessna UC-78
Low-wing aircraft
World War II trainer aircraft of the United States
Aircraft first flown in 1939
Retractable conventional landing gear
Twin piston-engined tractor aircraft